Strasburg Road was an early road in Pennsylvania connecting Philadelphia to Strasburg in Lancaster County. The route was surveyed by John Sellers and others in 1772-3 under the colonial administration of Governor Richard Penn and completed under the new administration of the independent state of Pennsylvania.
The route started at the "second ferry" on the Schuylkill River, today's Market Street in Philadelphia, and went through West Chester, East Fallowfield Township, and Gap, before ending in Strasburg. Earlier roads travelled much the same route, including a Native American path in use as early as 1620.

Earlier routes
A road following much of the same route had existed at least since the 1750s, but the area around the road only began to develop as the state constructed, or re-constructed, the road in the 1790s.

The use of wagons on this road began as early as 1714 as it developed out of the earlier Great Minquas Path.  Wagons on this road were the first to be called Conestoga wagons.

A Native American path, known as the Great Minquas Path went through much of the same area as early as 1620. Confusingly, there were several branches of this path, and it and some other early roads are also called the Conestoga Path or Conestoga Road. The path went east from the Conestoga to the area of the present day town of  Willow Street, then Strasburg, and Gap, then entered present day Chester County. There it continued east via Atglen, Parkesburg, Mortonville, and West Chester, crossed into Delaware County and there led through Lima and Rose Valley, where it could go south to Chester or east to Darby, and finally to Philadelphia. Parts of Pennsylvania Route 741 follow the path in Lancaster County, and parts of Pennsylvania Route 162 follow the path in Chester County. These modern roads are generally named "Strasburg Road" and are connected by smaller roads carrying street signs of "Strasburg Road" or "West Strasburg Road."

East of West Chester, the Minquas Path travelled well south of Pennsylvania Route 3, the West Chester Pike, which today carries traffic between Market Street in Philadelphia and Market Street in West Chester.  The name Strasburg Road is not used today east of West Chester except for a short stretch of road which branches off of the West Chester Pike going east, named "Strasburg Road".  After about a mile, this road becomes Goshen Road, which goes east to Darby Paoli Road, in Radnor Township, Delaware County, Pennsylvania.

Historic buildings

Due to the commercial use of Strasburg Road during the Colonial and Early Federal periods, at least twenty-three buildings or historic districts along the road have been listed on the National Register of Historic Places in Chester County.  From east to west, these are:

West Chester Downtown Historic District  includes Market Street, with a dozen individually listed buildings nearby
Taylor-Cope Historic District 
Cope's Bridge 
Taylor House 
Marshallton Historic District 
Marshallton Inn	
Humphry Marshall House 
Baily Farm 
Mortonville Hotel 
Bridge in East Fallowfield Township 	
Mortonville Bridge 
Rev. Joshua Vaughan House 
White Horse Tavern  
Robert Young House 
Drovers Inn 
Robert Wilson House	 
Isaac Pawling House 
Harry DeHaven House 
Asa Walton House 
Philip Dougherty Tavern  
Philip Dougherty House 
Parkesburg National Bank	 
Parkesburg School 

In Lancaster County
the Railroad Museum of Pennsylvania , which contains 25 NRHP listed locomotives and train cars, and
Strasburg Historic District 

are located on Strasburg Road.

References

Further reading

Streets in Philadelphia
Historic trails and roads in Pennsylvania